Ayiko Bia is an unauthorized compilation album by British Afro rock band Osibisa released in 1992 by Soundwings Records (MC-102.1078-2) and distributed by Serenade S.A., Barcelona, Spain.

Track listing

Sources
Taken from Black Magic Night: Live at the Royal Festival Hall (1977)

Personnel
Teddy Osei - Saxophone
Sol Amarfio - Drums
Mac Tontoh - Trumpet
Spartacus R - Bass
Robert Bailey - Keyboards
Wendel Richardson - Lead Guitar
Lasisi Amao - Percussion, Tenor Saxophone
Kiki Djan - Percussion
Darko Adams Potato – Percussion

References
All information gathered from back CD cover Ayiko Bia (Copyright © 1992 Soundwings Records MC-102.1078-2).
GoMusicNow

1992 compilation albums
Osibisa albums